Erhard Milch (30 March 1892 – 25 January 1972) was a German general field marshal (Generalfeldmarschall) of Jewish heritage who oversaw the development of the German air force (Luftwaffe) as part of the re-armament of Nazi Germany following World War I. He was State Secretary in the Reich Ministry of Aviation and Inspector General of the Air force. During most of World War II, he was in charge of all aircraft production and supply. He was convicted of war crimes and crimes against humanity during the Milch Trial, which was held before a U.S. military court in 1947, and sentenced to life imprisonment. However, Milch's sentence was commuted to 15 years in 1951. He was paroled in 1954, and died in 1972.

Ancestry and Jewish heritage
Milch was born in Wilhelmshaven, the son of Anton Milch, a Jewish pharmacist who served in the Imperial German Navy, and Clara, née Vetter. The Gestapo would later investigate Milch due to his Jewish heritage. Under the Nuremberg Laws, Milch would have been categorized as mixed race (mischling). However, he would not have been considered Jewish according to that religion's orthodoxy (or halakha), which states that a person’s Jewish status is passed down through the mother.

In 1935, rumours began to circulate that Milch's father was a Jew. The Gestapo began an investigation which was halted by Hermann Göring, the commander-in-chief of the Luftwaffe, who produced an affidavit by Milch's mother that his true father was her uncle, Karl Brauer. Milch was then issued with a German Blood Certificate. If true, that would mean that Milch's mother, Clara, committed not only adultery but also incest. 

Author and Holocaust denier David Irving claimed in his book The Rise and Fall of the Luftwaffe: The Life of Field Marshal Erhard Milch, that Milch asked him not to reveal the truth about his parentage, so although Irving states that Erhard's father was not Anton Milch and concentrates on his wealthy great-uncle Karl Brauer (who died in 1906), he does not actually name Brauer as his father. However, Irving, who claimed to have had access to the Field Marshal's private diary and papers, says the rumours about Milch's parentage began to spread in the autumn of 1933, and that Erhard Milch personally obtained a signed statement by his putative father Anton that he was not the father of Clara's children. Furthermore, Irving claimed that Clara Milch had already written to her son-in-law Fritz Herrmann in March 1933 explaining the circumstances of her marriage, and that Göring had initiated his own investigation that identified his real father. During the Nuremberg trials 1946, Milch was again questioned about his alleged Jewish father and Göring's role in the matter by Chief United States Prosecutor, Robert H. Jackson.

World War I and interwar career
Milch enlisted in the German Army in 1910, where he rose to the rank of lieutenant and commanded an artillery unit in East Prussia at the beginning of the First World War. He saw action against the Russian Army on the River Deime in September 1914 and later on the Angerapp Line in February 1915. In July 1915, he was transferred to the Fliegertruppe (Imperial Air Force) and trained as an aerial observer on the Western front, seeing action on the Somme in 1916 (through the period of it becoming the Luftstreitkräfte in October that year) and later in Flanders during 1917. After a spell as a company commander in the trenches in the spring and summer of 1918, in the waning days of the war, he was promoted to captain and appointed to command a fighter wing, Jagdgruppe 6, even though he had never trained as a pilot and could not fly himself.

Milch resigned from the military in 1920 to pursue a career in civil aviation. With squadron colleague Gotthard Sachsenberg, Milch formed a small airline in Danzig under the banner of Lloyd Luftdienst, Norddeutscher Lloyds union of regional German airlines. The airline linked Danzig to the Baltic States. In 1923, Milch became the managing director of its successor company. From there, Milch and Sachsenberg went to work for rival Junkers Luftverkehr, where Milch was appointed a managing director in 1925. In 1926, Milch was named a managing director (one of three) of the newly-formed airline Deutsche Luft Hansa. Milch joined the Nazi Party (number 123885) on 1 April 1929, but his membership was not officially acknowledged until March 1933, because Hitler deemed it desirable to keep the fact hidden for political reasons.

On 5 May 1933, Milch took up a position as State Secretary of the newly formed Reich Ministry of Aviation (RLM), answering directly to Hermann Göring. In this capacity, he was instrumental in establishing the Luftwaffe, the air force of Nazi Germany. Milch quickly used his position to settle personal scores with other aviation industry personalities, including Hugo Junkers and Willy Messerschmitt. Specifically, Milch banned Messerschmitt from submitting a design in the competition for a new fighter aircraft for the Luftwaffe. Messerschmitt outmanoeuvred Milch, circumventing the ban and successfully submitting a design. The Messerschmitt-designed Bayerische Flugzeugwerke corporate entry, the Bf 109, proved to be the winner. Messerschmitt maintained its leading position within the German aircraft industry until the failure of the Me 210 aircraft. Even after that Milch, as the leader, did not depose him, but put him in an inferior position.

In 1935 doubts about the ethnic origin of Erhard Milch began when rumors circulated that his father Anton Milch was Jewish. The Gestapo began an investigation but it was stopped by Göring, who forced Erhard's mother to sign a document that Anton was not the true father of Erhard and his brothers but that it was her uncle Karl Brauer. Those events and the later extension of the "Certificate of German Blood" were the background to Göring's statement, "I decide who is a Jew in the airforce". However, many believe that he was merely quoting Karl Lueger, the former mayor of Vienna.

World War II 

In a reorganization of 1 February 1939, Milch, now with the rank of Generaloberst, was given the additional job of Inspector-General of the Luftwaffe. After the outbreak of World War II, Milch commanded Luftflotte 5 during Operation Weserübung in Norway. Following the defeat of France, Milch was promoted to Generalfeldmarschall (field marshal) during the 1940 Field Marshal Ceremony. Following the suicide of Generaloberst Ernst Udet in November 1941, Milch succeeded him as Generalluftzeugmeister, in charge of all Luftwaffe aircraft production, armament and supply. In April 1942 he was named to the Central Planning Board along with Albert Speer, Reich Minister of Armaments and War Production, and Paul Körner, State Secretary of the Four Year Plan, in an effort to coordinate control over all industrial war production. 

Milch cancelled production of the ineffective and dangerous Me 210 and He 177 and put them back in development. Under his direction, aircraft production focused on mass production of the tested and tried models. Output doubled in the summer of 1943 in comparison with the winter of 1941–1942. Adam Tooze wrote "For the first time, the German aircraft industry was able to achieve substantial economies of scale. The resources pumped into the Luftwaffe in 1940–41 were now concentrated in mass assembly". To achieve this level of mass production, the Armaments Ministries and the industry cooperated with the SS to procure labour from concentration camps. Due to Milch's connections with the SS, the Luftwaffe had an advantage in obtaining slave labour. To increase the quantity, Milch also made some sacrifices in quality, notable in the case of the Bf 109. When the US Air Force began to directly challenge the fighter forces of the Luftwaffe, the cost of Milch's decisions was shown. The handling of the Bf 109 G was so bad that they became, in the words of Tooze, "little more than death traps".

On 10 August 1943, Milch finally addressed Germany's lack of a truly "four-engined" heavy bomber to carry out raids against Great Britain. He endorsed Arado Flugzeugwerke to be the subcontractor for the Heinkel He 177B separately engined heavy bomber design. Only three flyable prototypes were completed by early 1944. From March 1944, Milch, together with Speer, oversaw the activities of the Jägerstab ("Fighter Staff"), a governmental task force whose aim was to increase the production of fighter aircraft, in part by moving the production facilities underground. In cooperation with the SS, the task force played a key role in the exploitation of slave labour for the benefit of the German aircraft industry and the Luftwaffe.

When the agitation among the legions of foreign workers in his factories threatened production, Milch was able to refer to his association with Himmler

I spoke to Himmler recently about this, and told him his main task must be to see to the protection of German industry if unrest breaks out among this foreign scum. 

If, for instance, there is a mutiny at X, an officer with a couple of men, or a lieutenant with thirty troops, must appear in the factory and let fly with their machine-guns into the mob. The object is to lay out as many people as possible, if mutinies break out. This is the order I have issued, even if the people are our own foreign workers. 

Every tenth man is to be picked out, and every tenth man will be shot in front of the rest.

In 1944 Milch sided with Joseph Goebbels, the propaganda minister and Heinrich Himmler, the Reichsführer-SS, in attempting to convince Adolf Hitler to remove Göring from command of the Luftwaffe. When Hitler refused, Göring retaliated by forcing Milch out of his positions as State Secretary and Generalluftzeugmeister on 20 June 1944, and as Luftwaffe Inspector General in January 1945. From August 1944, he worked under Speer in the Rüstungsstab (Armaments Staff) but was sidelined and achieved little. He was injured in a car accident in the fall of 1944 and hospitalized for several weeks. Finally placed into the Führerreserve in March 1945, he was not reassigned.

Following Hitler's suicide, Milch attempted to flee Germany, but was apprehended by Allied forces on the Baltic coast on 4 May 1945. On surrendering, he presented his field-marshals' baton to British Brigadier Derek Mills-Roberts, who was so disgusted and angered by the atrocities he had seen when liberating the Bergen-Belsen concentration camp that he demanded to know Milch's thoughts on the terrible sights witnessed. Milch's reply (in English) was supposedly along the lines of - "these people are not human beings in the same way as you and me". This so infuriated Mills-Roberts that he seized the Field Marshal's baton from under Milch's arm and proceeded to brutally beat Milch with it over the head until it broke, afterwards switching to a champagne bottle. The following day, Mills-Roberts went to Field Marshal Bernard Montgomery to apologise for losing his temper with a senior German POW, only for Montgomery to cover his head with his hands in mock self-protection and joke "I hear you've got a thing about Field Marshals", with nothing more said regarding Mills-Roberts' indiscretion. The incident left Milch with several contusions and a fractured skull.

Trial and conviction at Nuremberg

Milch was intended by the Allies to be a witness for the prosecution at Nuremberg. However, seeing the conditions the defendants were being subjected to he changed his mind and refused to cooperate. He was then tried as a war criminal in 1947 by a United States Military Tribunal in Nuremberg. He was convicted on two counts:
 War crimes, by participating in the ill-treatment and use of the forced labour of prisoners of war (POWs) and the deportation of civilians to the same ends.
 Crimes against humanity, by participating in the murder, extermination, enslavement, deportation, imprisonment, torture, and the use of slave labour of civilians who came under German control, German nationals and prisoners of war.

Milch was sentenced to life imprisonment. Unlike the vast majority of other Nazi war criminals who were tried under U.S. military law, Milch was not immediately sent to Landsberg Prison to serve his sentence. He was instead sent to Rebdorf Prison, near Munich, but was eventually transferred to Landsberg. Milch's sentence was commuted to 15 years imprisonment in 1951, and he was paroled in June 1954. He lived out the remainder of his life in Düsseldorf, where he died in 1972 as the last living Luftwaffe field marshal.

Popular Culture

In the 1969 film Battle of Britain, Milch was portrayed by German actor Dietrich Frauboes.

Milch was portrayed by actor Robert Vaughn in the 1982 television film, Inside the Third Reich.

Awards
Knight's Cross of the Iron Cross on 4 May 1940 as Generaloberst and chief of Luftflotte 5 and Befehlshaber Nord (commander-in-chief north).
 Grand Cross with Swords of the Order of the White Rose of Finland on 30 March 1942 as Generalfeldmarschall.

References
Citations

Bibliography

External links
 

1892 births
1972 deaths
People from Wilhelmshaven
German Army personnel of World War I
Luftwaffe World War II field marshals
Recipients of the Knight's Cross of the Iron Cross
People convicted by the United States Nuremberg Military Tribunals
People from the Province of Hanover
German people convicted of crimes against humanity
German prisoners sentenced to life imprisonment
Prisoners sentenced to life imprisonment by the United States military
Recipients of the clasp to the Iron Cross, 1st class
Recipients of the Order of the Phoenix (Greece)
Grand Officers of the Order of Saints Maurice and Lazarus
Recipients of the Order of the Sacred Treasure
20th-century Freikorps personnel
German people of Jewish descent
Luftwaffe personnel convicted of war crimes
Lufthansa people
Military personnel from Lower Saxony
Luftstreitkräfte personnel